Charles Colquhoun Ballantyne,  (August 9, 1867 – October 19, 1950) was a Canadian politician.

A millionaire and one-time owner of Sherwin Williams Paints in Montreal, Ballantyne was president of the Canadian Manufacturer's Association and a member of the Montreal Harbour Board.  He also raised and commanded the 1st Battalion Grenadier Guards of Canada. He was appointed to Sir Robert Borden's World War I Union government. He held no parliamentary seat when Borden appointed him minister of public works, minister of marine and fisheries and minister of the naval service in October 1917. He became a Cabinet minister prior to being elected to the House of Commons of Canada in the December 1917 federal election; delayed for two weeks because of the Halifax Explosion. Ballantyne was one of a handful of Unionist Members of Parliament (MPs) elected from Quebec during the Conscription Crisis of 1917.

Even before the inquiry into the Halifax disaster had completed its proceedings on 4 February 1918, Ballantyne initiated the formation of a Royal Commission to investigate the Halifax Pilotage. As a result of the commission's findings (unpublished), Prime Minister Borden invoked the War Measures Act in mid-March. Subsequently, the government took control over the port of Halifax until the end of the war. Ballantyne retained his Cabinet portfolios when Arthur Meighen succeeded Borden as Prime Minister of Canada, but was defeated as a Conservative candidate in the 1921 election that brought down the Meighen government.

In 1932, Conservative Prime Minister R. B. Bennett appointed Ballantyne to the Senate of Canada. Ballantyne was appointed Leader of the Opposition in the Canadian Senate in 1942, and served in that role until 1945.

Archives 
There is a Charles Colquhoun Ballantyne fonds at Library and Archives Canada.

Footnotes

External links
 

1867 births
1950 deaths
Canadian senators from Quebec
Conservative Party of Canada (1867–1942) MPs
Conservative Party of Canada (1867–1942) senators
Members of the House of Commons of Canada from Quebec
Members of the King's Privy Council for Canada
Unionist Party (Canada) MPs
Anglophone Quebec people